Baron Peter von Meyendorff (Russian: Пётр Казимирович Мейендорф, born 2 August 1796 in Riga, died 7 March 1863 in Saint Petersburg) was a Russian diplomat from the Meyendorff family. From 1850 to 1854, he was Russian ambassador to Austria.

References 

1796 births
1863 deaths
Diplomats from Riga
People from the Governorate of Livonia
Baltic-German people
Russian nobility
Members of the State Council (Russian Empire)
Ambassadors of the Russian Empire to Prussia
Ambassadors of the Russian Empire to Austria
19th-century people from the Russian Empire
Honorary members of the Saint Petersburg Academy of Sciences
Recipients of the Order of St. Vladimir, 1st class